Hugh Campbell Rowley (March 1854 – after 1882) was an English rugby union footballer who played in the 1870s and 1880s. He played at representative level for England from 1879 to 1882, and at club level for Bowdon and Lymm Club, and Manchester Rugby Club, as a forward.

Early life
Rowley was born in Chorlton-on-Medlock.

Rugby union career
Rowley was originally a member of the Bowdon and Lymm Club, and was selected from this club to represent the county of Cheshire in the first match between Cheshire and Lancashire on 24 February 1877. He had the distinction of scoring the first try in that match, and the first point of importance against Lancashire. Ironically, Rowley then went on to play in and for Lancashire, transferring to the Manchester Football Club, and representing Lancashire in 1879 for whom he played over a number of years. He was also selected to play in several North v. South matches, once the pinnacle of domestic rugby competition.

Rowley made his international debut for England on 10 March 1879 in the match against Scotland match at Edinburgh. He played eight more times for England, (vs Scotland in 1879-80-81-82; vs Ireland, 1879-80-81-82; and Wales, 1881.)

Of the nine matches he played for his national side the team won five times, lost once, and drew three times.

He played his final match for England on 4 March 1882 against Scotland at Whalley Range, Manchester.

He was described in a contemporary account as a celebrated player and "one of the best all-round men who ever played the Rugby game." The account went on to say "Campbell Rowley was one of the most useful of football players, very strong and fast, was never done with, could play any position in the field equally well, and had his whole heart in the game."

Later life
Rowley later moved to Winnipeg, Manitoba, Canada.

References

1854 births
English rugby union players
England international rugby union players
Rugby union forwards
Year of death missing
Lancashire County RFU players
Rugby union players from Greater Manchester
Manchester Rugby Club players